Tshepo Lucky Montana was the chief executive officer of the Passenger Rail Agency of South Africa (Prasa) between 2010 and 2015.

Montana entered the public transport sector in the 1990s and was appointed to the board of Prasa's predecessor, the South African Rail Commuter Corporation (SARCC), in 2005; he later became the chief executive officer (CEO) at SARCC. According to the Mail & Guardian, he also served for a period as political adviser to Jeff Radebe while Radebe was Minister of Public Enterprises. He was appointed group CEO of Prasa in October 2010. Later that year, the Mail & Guardian reported that he was also a frontrunner for appointment as CEO of Trasnet, although he ultimately remained at Prasa until 2015. In April 2015, Prasa announced that Montana had expressed his intention to step down as CEO when his contracted expired at the end of March 2016. However, he did not reach his contract's expiry date and was dismissed in July 2015.

Montana's tenure at Prasa was controversial. In June 2022, the Zondo Commission, established to investigate allegations of state capture in the South African government, recommended that the Hawks should expedite its investigations into allegations that Montana was responsible for criminal misconduct while at Prasa; it also recommended that the National Prosecuting Authority should give "serious consideration" to the prospect of prosecuting Montana and that a special commission of inquiry should be established to investigate Prasa's "slide into almost total ruin" during and after Montana's tenure. The chairperson of the commission, Raymond Zondo, wrote:

Many, many days of the Commissions hearings were devoted to the allegations of the capture of Prasa and strident denials thereof, especially by Mr Montana. However, I am left with the uneasy perception that there is much about the ills of Prasa that has not yet been uncovered.

References 

Living people
21st-century South African people
Year of birth missing (living people)